The Federal Inventory of Amphibian Spawning Areas is part of a 2001 Ordinance of the Swiss Federal Council implementing the Federal Law on the Protection of Nature and Cultural Heritage. The inventory includes spawning areas of amphibians of national importance in Switzerland. The inventory includes permanent and temporary sites.

Permanent sites
This table is sorted by canton and municipality of location. Sites located in more than one canton are listed once for each canton.

See also 
 Nature parks in Switzerland

References

External links
 EUNIS: Amphibian Breeding Sites of National Importance (CH05), Common Database on Designated Areas (CDDA)
 Karch 

Amphibian Spawning Sites
Amphibian Spawning Sites
Amphibian conservation